Dominic Ressel (born 5 October 1993) is a German judoka. He is the 2017 European silver medalist in the 81 kg division.

References

External links
 
 

1993 births
German  male judoka
Living people
Judoka at the 2020 Summer Olympics
Olympic judoka of Germany
Medalists at the 2020 Summer Olympics
Olympic medalists in judo
Olympic bronze medalists for Germany
Sportspeople from Kiel
20th-century German people
21st-century German people